Docimodus johnstoni is a species of haplochromine cichlid. It is known from Lake Malawi, Lake Malombe, and the upper Shire River in Malawi, Mozambique, and Tanzania. This species has unusual feeding habits: it is reported to feed on fins of clariid catfishes. The specific name honours the British explorer, botanist, linguist and Colonial administrator, Sir Henry Hamilton Johnston  (also known as Sir Harry Johnston) (12 June 1858 – 31 July 1927), who presented the type to the British Museum (Natural History).

References

johnstoni
Fish of Malawi
Fish described in 1897
Taxa named by George Albert Boulenger
Taxonomy articles created by Polbot
Fish of Lake Malawi